Joanah Ngan-Woo (born 15 December 1995) is a New Zealand rugby union player. She plays Lock for the Black Ferns and was a member of their 2021 Rugby World Cup champion squad. She plays for Hurricanes Poua in the Super Rugby Aupiki competition and for Wellington provincially.

Personal life 
Ngan-Woo is of Chinese and Samoan descent. Her great-grandfather migrated from China to Samoa. She took up rugby in Year 9 at St Catherine's College in 2009 and was soon promoted to the Oriental Rongotai seniors while still a schoolgirl. She has a Bachelor of Arts in Social Policy and Education from Victoria University and also completed a Masters in International Relations in 2019.

Rugby career

2018 
Ngan-Woo was one of 28 players who were the first to receive a professional contract with the Black Ferns.

2019 
Ngan-Woo made her Black Ferns test debut against the United States on 2 July in the Women's Rugby Super Series in San Diego. She later earned her second cap against England. Ngan-Woo scored her first international try against Australia on 10 August at Perth. The Black Ferns thrashed the Wallaroos 47–10.

2021 
Ngan-Woo was selected for the Black Ferns 2021 Europe tour, she played in the second test match against England and in the first test match against France.

2022 
Ngan-Woo signed with the Hurricanes Poua for the inaugural 2022 season of Super Rugby Aupiki and scored the first ever Hurricanes Poua try against Chiefs Manawa in Hamilton.

Ngan-Woo was named for the Black Ferns squad for the 2022 Pacific Four Series. She was selected again for the two-test series against the Wallaroos for the Laurie O'Reilly Cup in August where she scored tries in both tests.

Ngan-Woo made the Black Ferns 32-player squad for the 2021 Rugby World Cup. She became the first ever Black Fern forward to score a first try in a Rugby World Cup. In the World Cup final, she made the winning play as she stole the ball from England's line-out throw.

2023 
Ngan-Woo recommitted to Hurricanes Poua for a second season.

References

External links 

 Black Ferns Profile

1995 births
Living people
New Zealand women's international rugby union players
New Zealand female rugby union players
Samoa female rugby sevens players
Rugby union players from Wellington City
New Zealand sportspeople of Chinese descent
New Zealand sportspeople of Samoan descent